Rock Springs Camp Meeting Ground is a historic Methodist camp meeting ground located near Denver, Lincoln County, North Carolina.  The arbor was built in 1832, and is a rectangular open structure with a deep hipped roof and ventilation cap at the apex.  It has a raised platform with a pine pulpit and seating for 1,000.  The property has 288 numbered wooden "tents" placed in two and a partial third concentric ring around the arbor. Tent No. 1 is believed to date to the early-1830s. Rock Springs Camp Meeting Ground is the earliest camp meeting organization in North Carolina.

It was listed on the National Register of Historic Places in 1972.

Notes

References

Further reading
Agosta, Carolyn Steele, "Two Weeks Every Summer, Stories from Camp Meeting", short stories inspired by Rock Spring Camp Meeting, Denver, NC, and Lincoln County, NC. https://www.carolynsteeleagosta.com

External links
Rock Springs Camp Meeting website
Carnegie Survey of the Architecture of the South: Old Camp Meeting, Denver, Lincoln County, North Carolina

Properties of religious function on the National Register of Historic Places in North Carolina
Religious buildings and structures completed in 1832
Buildings and structures in Lincoln County, North Carolina
National Register of Historic Places in Lincoln County, North Carolina
Methodism in North Carolina
Camp meeting grounds
Campgrounds in North Carolina